The Swedish Foundry Workers' Union (Gjutare) was a trade union representing workers in foundries in Sweden.

The union was established in 1893, as a split from the Swedish Metalworkers' Union, with 389 members.  In 1899, it affiliated to the Swedish Trade Union Confederation.  Its membership peaked at 12,294 in 1950, and was then fairly stable but collapsed in 1963, to only 4,907.  The following year, it finally rejoined the Swedish Metalworkers' Union.

References

1893 establishments in Sweden
1964 disestablishments in Sweden
Swedish Trade Union Confederation
Foundry workers' trade unions
Trade unions in Sweden
Trade unions established in 1893
Trade unions disestablished in 1964